Venomous is the fourth studio album by Indonesian metal band Burgerkill, released in June 2011. Venomous is the first album to feature the vocals of lead vocalist Vicky.

The album became a success in the local heavy metal music scene. In the first week of album promo concert at Bandung Berisik, a local metal venue, about 1,000 compact disks were sold. It was listed third after Satu Untuk Berbagi and Jemima as the best studio album release for 2011 by Rolling Stone Indonesia.

Album concept
In an interview, Eben explains to Mahardhika Utama of Formagz, an Indonesian online music magazine, the reason behind the chosen name: 

In the same time Vicky explained about musical style and influences:

Track listing

Reception

Venomous was well received by several critics. Brian Fischer Giffin of "LoudMag", an Australian online music magazine stated that: 
 
Rod Whitfield of "Metal Forge" magazine expressed his surprise reaction to Venomous, and wrote:

Personnel
 Eben – guitars
 Ramdan – bass
 Vicky – vocals
 Andris – drums
 Agung – guitars

Credits

 Burgerkill – arranger, producer
 Didin Bahe – band photo
 Citra Frolic – consultant
 Begundal Hellclub – choir, chorus
 Ammy Strings Quartet – strings, arranger
 Agung Hellfrog – vocals
 Yayat Ahdiat – producer, mastering, engineer, mixing
 Ramdan Agus – bass, group member, engineer
 Innu Regawa – engineer, digital editing
 Gus Satrianang – guitars

References

2011 albums
Burgerkill albums